The C0719 RNA is a bacterial non-coding RNA of 222 nucleotides in length that is found between the yghK and glcB genes in the genomes of Escherichia coli and Shigella flexneri. This non-coding RNA was originally identified in E.coli using high-density oligonucleotide probe arrays (microarray.)  The function of this ncRNA is unknown.

See also
C0299 RNA
C0343 RNA
C0465 RNA

References

External links
 

Non-coding RNA